Wuqing railway station is on the Beijing-Tianjin Intercity Railway in Wuqing District, Tianjin, China. It is the only midway stop presently open to intercity railway traffic. The only trains calling at Wuqing are those with train numbers between C2201 and C2268.

Platform 1 is for trains heading to Tianjin, while Platform 2 serves trains to Beijing South. Two tracks run through the centre of the station and are reserved for trains on direct services not calling at this station.

The station building is to the north of the platforms and features a combined ticketing and waiting hall.

See also
Wuqing railway station is 5 km away from Yangcun railway station on Beijing-Shanghai railway.

Railway stations in Tianjin
Railway stations in China opened in 2008
Stations on the Beijing–Tianjin Intercity Railway